Fervidicella is a Gram-negative, thermophilic and strictly anaerobic bacterial genus from the family of Clostridiaceae with one known species (Falcatimonas natans). Fervidicella metallireducens has been isolated from microbial mats from the Great Artesian Basin.

References

Clostridiaceae
Bacteria genera
Monotypic bacteria genera
Taxa described in 2010